Nahla Mahmoud (born 1986/7) is a Sudanese-born British writer, ex-Muslim, secularist, environmentalist, and human rights activist, and spokesperson for the Council of Ex-Muslims of Britain. She's known for being vocal against religious extremism; advocating free-speech, LGBT rights, awareness on climate change . She fled to the United Kingdom in 2010.

Early life and education 
Mahmoud was born in Wau, Sudan and raised as a Sunni Muslim. In primary school art class, she drew a picture of Allah, which is considered forbidden by most Muslims, and her teacher punished her for it. Mahmoud was disgruntled by the fact that she did not enjoy the same rights as boys and men, that she couldn't draw or sculpt what she wanted, or keep a dog as a pet, that she was not allowed to ask critical questions, and that she could not learn about evolution.

Mahmoud studied ecology at the University of Khartoum, and worked for the Science Students Association. At university she came across a professor who opposed the Omar al-Bashir regime; he had just been released from jail where he had been tortured for teaching the theory of evolution. This revelation shocked her and made her feel like she 'didn't exist in Sudan as woman, as a scientist'. “These incidents made me gradually refuse Islam until I completely renounced it and became an atheist.” This made life even more difficult for her, because under Sudanese law, apostasy could be punishable by the death penalty. Mahmoud resolved that she no longer wanted to live under Sharia in Sudan, and eventually fled to the UK in 2010.

Activism

Sharia interview controversy 

Mahmoud became a spokesperson for the Council of Ex-Muslims of Britain (CEMB). In this capacity she appeared in a short (1 minute, 39 seconds) televised interview on Channel 4's 4thought.tv in January 2013 to give her perspective on "What does Sharia law have to offer Britain?". She recounted how she grew up living under Sharia in Sudan, where she was ‘always dealt with as a second-class citizen, always brought up to believe that I am an incomplete human being [who] needed a man as a guard.’ Mahmoud found it astonishing that Britain, the country she had fled to escape Islamic rule, maintained a similar system of sharia courts, arguing that ‘Everyone should have equal rights and live under one secular law.’ Even the official Facebook page of the Sudanese Armed Forces called Mahmoud an infidel and apostate. The local LibDem leader, Spencer Hagard, who investigated Al Bander, saw no fault in his behaviour, and even regarded him more highly than before. Mahmoud filed a complaint with the police, but received no protection.

Ex-Muslim rights 

At the Secular Conference 2014, Mahmoud highlighted the aggression from Islamists faced by ex-Muslims, critics of Islam, atheists of all backgrounds, and anti-traditional liberal Muslims, commenting that it was "really scary" that a 2011 Policy Exchange survey found that 34% of British Muslims aged 16 to 24 supported the death penalty for apostasy. She rebuked the regressive left attitude of some Westerners who dismiss any kind of criticism of Islam as 'islamophobia', and ignore Islamic intolerance in the spirit of 'multiculturalism'.

Mahmoud has estimated that during the years 2010, 2011 and 2012, there have been between 120 and 170 Sudanese citizens who have been convicted for apostasy, most of whom repented to avoid a death sentence.

Mahmoud appeared in Among Nonbelievers (2015), a Dutch documentary on HUMAN about the situation of ex-Muslims worldwide.

Environmentalism 
Mahmoud is an environmentalist who is passionate about nature, and received training as an ecologist. In her 2013 research paper "Climate Change and Violent Conflicts in East Africa" for the Evelyn Oldfield Unit, she sought to "[question] the traditional analyses of conflicts, which rely primarily on ethnic, religious, and cultural explanations since these do not take account of the increasingly obvious link between the growing scarcity of renewable resources and violent conflict in the three East African countries [Sudan, South Sudan and Ethiopia. Shortages of cropland, fresh water, woodland, pasture and marine resources cannot be ignored."

See also 
 Ayaan Hirsi Ali
 Criticism of Islam
 Maryam Namazie
 Yasmine Mohammed

References 

British human rights activists
Women human rights activists
British secularists
British former Muslims
Former Muslim critics of Islam
English atheists
English ecologists
Women ecologists
English environmentalists
English women writers
Former Muslims turned agnostics or atheists
Sudanese former Muslims
Sudanese women writers
Sudanese emigrants to the United Kingdom
British critics of Islam
Anti-Islam sentiment in the United Kingdom
Arab secularists
Articles containing video clips